is a former Japanese football player.

Playing career
Kawashima was born in Osaka Prefecture on June 4, 1970. After he dropped out of Chukyo University, he joined the Japan Soccer League club Matsushita Electric (later Gamba Osaka) in 1991. However he did not play as much as Kenji Honnami and Hayato Okanaka. In 1996, he moved to the Japan Football League club Otsuka Pharmaceutical. He played as a regular goalkeeper in 1996. However he gradually played less often during 1997 and he retired at the end of the 1998 season.

Club statistics

References

External links

vortis.up

1970 births
Living people
Chukyo University alumni
Association football people from Osaka Prefecture
Japanese footballers
J1 League players
Japan Football League (1992–1998) players
Gamba Osaka players
Tokushima Vortis players
Association football goalkeepers